Adoxosia excisa is a moth of the subfamily Arctiinae. It is found in Brazil.

References

Moths described in 1900
Lithosiini
Moths of South America